Christian Michael Prieto (born August 24, 1972) is a former professional baseball player who played one season in Major League Baseball for the Los Angeles Angels of Anaheim in . Prieto attended Carmel High School, and the University of Nevada. Prieto is currently the first base coach for the Tampa Bay Rays.

Career 
He was signed June 8, 1993 by San Diego Padres scout Don Lyle after being selected by the Padres in the 24th round of 1993 draft. Prieto was granted free agency, October 15, 1999, and subsequently signed by the Los Angeles Dodgers, January 20, 2000. After being signed by the Dodgers, he was loaned to the Mexico City Red Devils from July 18 – September 6, 2000. The Dodgers allowed him to go to free agency on October 15, 2001. Prieto was then signed by the Houston Astros on December 17, 2001, then released on April 29, 2002. The Oaxaca Guerreros signed him in May 2002, then he played for the independent Chico Outlaws starting in August 2002. The Oakland Athletics signed him on November 8, 2002, then was granted free agency, October 15, 2003. Signed by the St. Louis Cardinals January 7, 2004, then granted free agency, October 15, 2004. Finally, the Los Angeles Angels of Anaheim signed him as a free agent on December 14, 2004, and then released him on October 15, 2005.

Preito made two appearances with the Angels during the 2005 season. Manager Mike Scioscia noted at the time that Prieto would likely be used as a defensive replacement, or possibly as a situational hitter due to his bunting abilities. His first roster appearance was made on May 14, 2005, at Comerica Park against the Detroit Tigers. His final MLB appearance was made on May 16, 2005, at Jacobs Field against the Cleveland Indians.

Coaching career
On October 24, 2021, Prieto was hired as the first base coach for the Tampa Bay Rays.

References

External links 

1972 births
Living people
Albuquerque Dukes players
American expatriate baseball players in Mexico
Baseball coaches from California
Baseball players from California
Chico Heat players
Diablos Rojos del México players
Las Vegas 51s players
Las Vegas Stars (baseball) players
Los Angeles Angels players
Major League Baseball center fielders
Memphis Chicks players
Memphis Redbirds players
Mexican League baseball center fielders
Minor league baseball managers
Mobile BayBears players
Nevada Wolf Pack baseball players
New Orleans Zephyrs players
People from Carmel-by-the-Sea, California
Rancho Cucamonga Quakes players
Sacramento River Cats players
Salt Lake Stingers players
Seattle Mariners coaches
Spokane Indians players